Microsoft IntelliType is the brand driver for Microsoft's series of computer keyboards. It has been succeeded by Microsoft Mouse and Keyboard Center, which combines IntelliType with IntelliPoint.

IntelliType supports all known Microsoft keyboards (including those that are shipped as parts of desktop sets, as well as entertainment keyboards – i.e. those that are intended for Media center). However, advanced features may only be available on certain models (the users select their keyboard's type inside the program to access that keyboard type's specific button selection).

Supported keyboards 
Note: Version 8.0 and above dropped PS/2 support for the following list. As even adapters can't assist, Microsoft keeps version 7.1 as an offered download for users who still own keyboards with PS/2 connectors (instead of USB).

Special features 
If the keyboard has multimedia buttons, the user can define them to run any program or action.

On-screen indication of NumLock/CapsLock toggling with some keyboards.

On-screen indication of volume level when level is changed.

Limitations 
While the user could always define special keys (and multimedia keys, if such exist), it was only possible since version 6.3 to define them not just globally but also per application.

Version 6.2 forced the user to constantly check for updates by installing and launching the file "dpupdchk.exe" in the background. It must stay in the background for the control panel's settings to launch (although it could be avoided by renaming the file to something else). Version 6.3 fixed this behavior by only making it an opt-in option during the installation.

Version 7.0 and later in Windows 7 64-bit has recently been proven to disable the media keys (Play/Pause, Next, Previous, Stop) for third-party media players such as iTunes and Media Jukebox when they are not the primary window of focus. Some workaround exists: This behavior continues to be an issue as of Version 8.

See also 
 Microsoft Mouse and Keyboard Center
 IntelliPoint — Microsoft mouse driver.

Notes and references

External links 
 Microsoft IntelliType Hacks

Microsoft software
Utilities for macOS
Utilities for Windows